On 24 November 1991, British musician and Queen frontman Freddie Mercury died from bronchial pneumonia at his home in Kensington. He had exhibited HIV/AIDS symptoms as early as 1982 and was diagnosed with AIDS in 1987.

Mercury announced his diagnosis the day before his death, from complications from the disease, at the age of 45. In 1992, a concert in tribute to him was held at Wembley Stadium, in benefit of AIDS awareness.

Timeline 
Freddie Mercury exhibited HIV/AIDS symptoms as early as 1982. Authors Matt Richards and Mark Langthorne have stated in their biographical book about Mercury, Somebody to Love: The Life, Death, and Legacy of Freddie Mercury, that Mercury secretly visited a doctor in New York City to get a white lesion on his tongue checked (which might have been hairy leukoplakia, one of the first signs of an infection) a few weeks before Queen's final American appearance with Mercury on Saturday Night Live on 25 September 1982. They also stated that he had associated with someone who was recently infected with HIV on the same day of their final US appearance, when he began to exhibit more symptoms.

In October 1986, the British press reported that Mercury had his blood tested for HIV/AIDS at a Harley Street clinic. According to his partner, Jim Hutton, Mercury was diagnosed with AIDS in late April 1987. Around that time, Mercury claimed in an interview to have tested negative for HIV. The British press pursued the rumours over the next few years, fuelled by Mercury's increasingly gaunt appearance, Queen's absence from touring, and reports from his former lovers to tabloid journals. By 1990, rumours about Mercury's health were rife. At the 1990 Brit Awards held at the Dominion Theatre, London, on 18 February, Mercury made his final appearance on stage, when he joined the rest of Queen to collect the Brit Award for Outstanding Contribution to British Music. Mercury and his inner circle of colleagues and friends continually denied the stories. It has been suggested that Mercury could have helped AIDS awareness by speaking earlier about his illness. Mercury kept his condition private to protect those closest to him; May later confirmed that Mercury had informed the band of his illness much earlier.

Filmed in May 1991, the music video for "These Are the Days of Our Lives" features a very thin Mercury in his final scenes in front of the camera. In the video, Mercury wears a waistcoat with pictures of cats that was made for him by Queen costume designer Diana Moseley. With his farewell look straight at the camera as the song ends, Mercury whispers "I still love you", directed to his fans, which are his last words on camera. Director of the video Rudi Dolezal comments, "AIDS was never a topic. We never discussed it. He didn't want to talk about it. Most of the people didn't even 100 percent know if he had it, apart from the band and a few people in the inner circle. He always said, 'I don't want to put any burden on other people by telling them my tragedy. Video director Dolezal had been told beforehand to keep things speedy due to Mercury's ailing condition, but before shooting wrapped, Mercury requested one more take for the last lyrics of the song: "Those days are gone now but one thing's still true / When I look and I find I still love you". Jordan Runtagh for People writes, "On the last line, he summons all his strength for a final heroic pose before collapsing into himself with a soft laugh. Staring through the camera, he whispers a final "I still love you" before snapping his fingers, walking out of frame with a flourish". Dolezal comments, "In these last few seconds of that song, he gives us a résumé of his whole life: 'I was a big superstar, but don't take it too seriously.' And then, 'I still love you,' which is to the fans. Then he walks out of life. Even in his last moments, he planned his exit artistically. That's how he wanted it to be."

The rest of the band were ready to record when Mercury felt able to come into the studio, for an hour or two at a time. May said of Mercury: "He just kept saying. 'Write me more. Write me stuff. I want to just sing this and do it and when I am gone you can finish it off.' He had no fear, really." Justin Shirley-Smith, the assistant engineer for those last sessions, said: "This is hard to explain to people, but it wasn't sad, it was very happy. He [Freddie] was one of the funniest people I ever encountered. I was laughing most of the time, with him. Freddie was saying [of his illness] 'I'm not going to think about it, I'm going to do this.

After the conclusion of his work with Queen in June 1991, Mercury retired to his home in Kensington, West London. His former partner, Mary Austin, was a particular comfort in his final years, and in the last few weeks made regular visits to look after him. Near the end of his life, Mercury began to lose his sight, and declined so that he was unable to leave his bed. Mercury chose to hasten his death by refusing medication and took only painkillers. On 22 November 1991, Mercury called Queen's manager Jim Beach to his Kensington home to prepare a public statement, which was released the following day:

"Following the enormous conjecture in the press over the last two weeks, I wish to confirm that I have been tested HIV positive and have AIDS. I felt it correct to keep this information private to date to protect the privacy of those around me. However, the time has come now for my friends and fans around the world to know the truth and I hope that everyone will join with me, my doctors and all those worldwide in the fight against this terrible disease. My privacy has always been very special to me and I am famous for my lack of interviews. Please understand this policy will continue."

On the evening of 24 November 1991, about 24 hours after issuing the statement, Mercury died at the age of 45 at his home in Kensington. The cause of death was bronchial pneumonia resulting from AIDS. His close friend Dave Clark of the Dave Clark Five was at the bedside vigil when Mercury died. Austin phoned Mercury's parents and sister to break the news, which reached newspaper and television crews in the early hours of 25 November.

Reaction 

Following his death, the outer walls of Garden Lodge in Logan Place became a shrine to Mercury, with mourners paying tribute by covering the walls in graffiti messages. Three years later Time Out magazine reported that "the wall outside the house has become London's biggest rock 'n' roll shrine". Fans continued to visit to pay their respects with letters appearing on the walls until 2017, when Austin had the wall cleared. Hutton was involved in a 2000 biography of Mercury, Freddie Mercury, the Untold Story, and also gave an interview for The Times in September 2006 for what would have been Mercury's 60th birthday.

Tributes and services 

Mercury's funeral service was conducted on 27 November 1991 by a Zoroastrian priest at West London Crematorium, where he is commemorated by a plinth under his birth name. In attendance at Mercury's service were his family and 35 of his close friends, including Elton John and the members of Queen. His coffin was carried into the chapel to the sounds of "Take My Hand, Precious Lord"/"You've Got a Friend" by Aretha Franklin. In accordance with Mercury's wishes, Mary Austin took possession of his cremated remains and buried them in an undisclosed location. The whereabouts of his ashes are believed to be known only to Austin, who has said that she will never reveal them.

Bohemian Rhapsody was re-released in 1991 following Freddie's death and shortly thereafter reached number-one 16 years after its debut.

In 1992, a concert in tribute to him was held at Wembley Stadium, in benefit of AIDS awareness. A number of guests appeared at the concert with the remaining members of Queen, while Elizabeth Taylor spoke of Mercury as being "an extraordinary rock star who rushed across our cultural landscape like a comet shooting across the sky". The show marked bassist John Deacon's final full-length concert with Queen (save a short live appearance with Brian May, Roger Taylor and Elton John in 1997). The profits from the concert were used to launch the Mercury Phoenix Trust, an AIDS charity organization.

Mercury spent and donated to charity much of his wealth during his lifetime, with his estate valued around £8 million at the time of his death. He bequeathed his home, Garden Lodge, and the adjoining Mews, as well as a 50% of all privately owned shares, to Mary Austin. His sister, Kashmira Cooke, received 25%, as did his parents, Bomi and Jer Bulsara, which Cooke acquired upon their deaths. He willed £500,000 to Joe Fannelli; £500,000 to Jim Hutton; £500,000 to Peter Freestone; and £100,000 to Terry Giddings. Mercury, who never drove a car because he had no licence, was often chauffeured around London in his Rolls-Royce Silver Shadow from 1979 until his death. The car was passed to his sister Kashmira who made it available for display at public events, including the West End premiere of the musical We Will Rock You in 2002, before it was auctioned off at the NEC in Birmingham in 2013 for £74,600.

References

Works cited
 

1991 in British music
1991 in England
AIDS-related deaths in England
Mercury, Freddie
Freddie Mercury
November 1991 events in the United Kingdom
Queen (band)